Austrofromia is a genus of starfish belonging to the family Ophidiasteridae.

Description

Species 
 Austrofromia polypora (H.L. Clark, 1916)
 Austrofromia schultzei (Döderlein, 1910)

References 

Ophidiasteridae
Asteroidea genera
Taxa named by Hubert Lyman Clark